Deer Creek is a census-designated place in Gila County in the U.S. state of Arizona.  Deer Creek  is located almost directly between the community of Tonto Basin and the town of Payson near Arizona State Route 87.  The population as of the 2010 U.S. Census was 216.

Geography

There is an actual creek by the name of Deer Creek, which when not dry, flows by this Village of Deer Creek. The remains of David Gowan, a well-known pioneer, were buried just where they were found beside the North Fork of Deer Creek, close to Bars Canyon. . Today, the grave site is marked and preserved.
(There is a different Deer Creek in the Grand Canyon which flows into the Colorado River.)

Demographics

References

Census-designated places in Gila County, Arizona